Jessica Sonya DiCicco (born June 10, 1980) is an American actress. She is known for voicing in animated television series and video games. Her first voice role was the announcer for Nickelodeon's educational channel Noggin. DiCicco has since voiced various other characters for Nickelodeon, including Gwen Wu in The Mighty B!, Selina and Miele	in Winx Club, Lynn Loud and Lucy Loud in The Loud House, and Annie Bramley in It's Pony.

Some of her voice roles on other networks include Maggie Pesky in Disney Channel's The Buzz on Maggie and Flame Princess in Cartoon Network's Adventure Time, which earned her worldwide recognition. She received a Daytime Emmy nomination for voicing Malina in The Emperor's New School.

Early life
DiCicco was born in Los Angeles, California on June 10, 1980. Her father is television and film actor Bobby Di Cicco. Her family moved to New York City when she was young and she was raised on the Upper West Side. In second grade, she was selected by Marlo Thomas to appear on the ABC special Free to Be... A Family. She was also cast by Francis Ford Coppola in The Godfather Part III as an unnamed child, and also had a guest role in Kate and Allie. She had a small role as young Cindy Zagarella in the 1993 film Household Saints. At age 15, she was the photographer on a cover story for New York magazine about prep school gangsters, which was published in December 1996.
DiCicco has also worked on music from Kimbo Educational.

Career
DiCicco attended Newhouse School at Syracuse University, hoping to learn more about production as she had primarily done on-camera work with Nickelodeon. Before heading to college, she met Newhouse alum and Nickelodeon producer Mike Pecoriello, who offered her an opportunity to be the voice of a new educational channel called Noggin. She agreed to do the work while being a student and offered to record promos from Syracuse. She was the voice of Noggin throughout her college years and graduated in 2002. She was also the voice of Miguzis Erin on Cartoon Network.

In 1998, DiCicco appeared in the NBC miniseries Witness to the Mob and in the TV film In the Nick of Time. Besides her appearances in television and commercials, DiCicco has worked on stage with several repertory companies. In 1999, DiCicco and her co-stars in the Nickelodeon pilot Bus No. 9 were nominated a Young Artist Award, but lost to The Sweetest Gift. She also starred in a miniseries called As Our Schoolbus Turns.

As a voice actress, DiCicco had lead roles on The Buzz on Maggie, The Emperor's New School, Loonatics Unleashed, and Shuriken School. She had recurring roles on The Replacements, El Tigre: The Adventures of Manny Rivera, American Dragon: Jake Long, Bratz, and All Grown Up!. She co-starred as Shelby in the DreamWorks film Over the Hedge and voiced Gwen on Amy Poehler's television series for Nickelodeon, The Mighty B!. DiCicco was the voice of Master Viper in the Kung Fu Panda short film Secrets of the Furious Five. In 2012, she joined the Cartoon Network show Adventure Time  starting from its season three finale, where she voiced Flame Princess; the show has now run over seven seasons. She also voiced in Pound Puppies and Gravity Falls. She also voices Lynn and Lucy Loud in the Nickelodeon animated series, The Loud House. She was nominated for a Daytime Emmy in 2008 for her performance as Malina on The Emperor's New School, but lost to Eartha Kitt, who did Yzma in the same series. DiCicco provides the voice of Toby the cactus and the sounds of the mule Clementine on Sheriff Callie's Wild West.

DiCicco has also contributed to several video games, including Psychonauts, Kingdom Hearts II, Hot Shots Tennis, and Pimp My Ride.

Filmography

Animation

Anime

Feature films

Direct-to-video and television films

Video games

Other dub roles

Live action

References

External links
 
 

1980 births
Living people
Actresses from Los Angeles
Actresses from New York City
American child actresses
American film actresses
American people of Italian descent
American television actresses
American video game actresses
American voice actresses
People from the Upper West Side
20th-century American actresses
21st-century American actresses